Przemysław Wacław Turek (born 1960) is a Polish orientalist of the Institute of Middle and Far Eastern Studies , Jagiellonian University), and a head of the Department of Israel and the Levant .

Membership in Organizations and Societies
 Polish Oriental Society.
 American Oriental Society since 2014.
 International Association of Maltese Linguistics  since 2014.
 European Association of Israel Studies  since 2017.
 Royal Asiatic Society since 2017. 
 European Association of Biblical Studies since 2018.

Books
 Słownik zapożyczeń pochodzenia arabskiego w polszczyźnie (Dictionary of Loanwords of Arabic Origin in Polish), Universitas, Kraków 2001 [562 pp.]
 Od Gilgamesza do kasydy. Poezja semicka w oryginale i w przekładzie (From Gilgamesh to Qasida: Semitic Poetry in Original Version and in Translation), Księgarnia Akademicka, Kraków 2010 [471 pp.]
 "Programy nauczania języka polskiego jako obcego. Poziomy A1 – C2". Praca zbiorowa pod redakcją Iwony Janowskiej, Ewy Lipińskiej, Agnieszki Rabiej, Anny Seretny, Przemysława Turka, Biblioteka „LingVariów”. Seria: Podręczniki. T. 1, Księgarnia Akademicka, Kraków 2011
 "Orientalia w “Zbiorze potrzebniejszych wiadomości porządkiem alfabetu ułożonych” Ignacego Krasickiego". Opracował zespół pod redakcją Pawła Siwca [Renata Czekalska, Julia Krajcarz, Anna Krasnowolska, Agnieszka Kuczkiewicz-Fraś, Halina Marlewicz, Ewa Siemieniec-Gołaś, Paweł Siwiec, Przemysław Turek], Orientalia Polonica 1, Księgarnia Akademicka, Kraków 2015
 "Literatura Orientu w piśmiennictwie polskim XIX wieku. Część I". Opracował zespół pod redakcją Pawła Siwca [Sylwia Filipowska, Paweł Siwiec, Przemysław Turek], Orientalia Polonica 5, Księgarnia Akademicka, Kraków 2016
 "Maltese. Contemporary Changes and Historical Innovations". Edited by Przemysław Turek and Julia Nintemann, Studia Typologica. Volume 30, De Gruyter Mouton, Berlin - Boston 2022.

Other publications [in English]
 Syriac Song of Pearl as the basis for translations – a critical outline [in:] Języki orientalne w przekładzie – Konferencja, Kraków 20-21 maja 2002,  Kraków 2002, pp. 113–122.
 The 30th  Ode of Solomon as an oldest example of the great Syriac poetry and the development of Syriac prosody, „Orientalia Christiana Cracoviensia” 2 (2010), 109-120.
 Syriac Heritage of the Saint Thomas Christians: Language and Liturgical Tradition, „Orientalia Christiana Cracoviensia” 3 (2011), 115-130. 
 Crucifixion of Jesus – Historical Fact, Christian Faith and Islamic Denial, „Orientalia Christiana Cracoviensia” 3 (2011), 131-156. 
 Arab Spring: Its Consequences for Arabic Countries and Its Impact on European Policy, [in:] K. Bojko (red.), Poland-Jordan-European Union: A New Role of Europe in the Middle East after the Arab Spring, Amman: The University of Jordan Press, 2013, pp. 89–102.

References

 Polish Science page 
 Publications on web page academia.edu
 Biogram na stronie Instytutu Bliskiego i Dalekiego Wschodu UJ
 International Association of Maltese Linguistics
 Library of Congress 

Polish orientalists
Polish Arabists
1960 births
Academic staff of Jagiellonian University
Living people